Harrison Clark (born 11 May 2003) is an English professional footballer who plays as a midfielder.  He currently plays for Marske United on loan from Gateshead.  Clark previously played for Stirling Albion and Livingston.

Club career
Clark began his career with Chester-le-Street United before signing for Livingston in 2021.

He spent a loan spell with Arbroath in 2021, making 8 league appearances for them.

He spent a loan spell with Kelty Hearts in 2021, picking up a Scottish League Two winners medal.

The midfielder joined Stirling Albion on loan in July 2022, turning out 15 times for the Binos.

Clark left Livingston by mutual consent in January 2023, failing to make a single first team appearance.

He signed for Gateshead in February 2023.

Clark signed for Marske United on loan on 28 February 2023.

Honours
Kelty Hearts
Scottish League Two: 2021–22

References

External links
Harrison Clark on Soccerbase

2003 births
Living people
English footballers
Scottish Football League players
Association football midfielders
Livingston F.C. players
Arbroath F.C. players
Kelty Hearts F.C. players
Scottish Professional Football League players
Stirling Albion F.C. players
Gateshead F.C. players
Marske United F.C. players